The 1973 Norwegian Football Cup was the 68th edition of the Norwegian annual knockout football tournament. The Cup was won by Strømsgodset after beating Rosenborg in the cup final with the score 1–0. This was Strømsgodset's third Norwegian Cup title.

First round

|-
|colspan="3" style="background-color:#97DEFF"|Replay

|-
|colspan="3" style="background-color:#97DEFF"|2nd replay

|}

Second round

|-
|colspan="3" style="background-color:#97DEFF"|Replay

|}

Third round

|colspan="3" style="background-color:#97DEFF"|27 June 1973

|-
|colspan="3" style="background-color:#97DEFF"|28 June 1973

|-
|colspan="3" style="background-color:#97DEFF"|29 June 1973

|-
|colspan="3" style="background-color:#97DEFF"|1 July 1973

|-
|colspan="3" style="background-color:#97DEFF"|4 July 1973

|-
|colspan="3" style="background-color:#97DEFF"|Replay: 4 July 1973

|}

Fourth round

|colspan="3" style="background-color:#97DEFF"|19 August 1973

|}

Quarter-finals

|colspan="3" style="background-color:#97DEFF"|2 September 1973

|}

Semi-finals

|colspan="3" style="background-color:#97DEFF"|26 September 1973

|}

Final

Strømsgodset's winning squad: Inge Thun, Per Rune Wøllner, Johnny Vidar Pedersen, 
Tor Alsaker-Nøstdahl, Svein Dahl Andersen, Odd Arild Amundsen, Finn Aksel Olsen, Bjørn Odmar Andersen, 
Thorodd Presberg, Steinar Pettersen, Ingar Pettersen, Bjørn Erik Halvorsen, Helge Widemann Karlsen and Runar Larsen.

References
http://www.rsssf.no

Norwegian Football Cup seasons
Norway
Football Cup